Onuche Ogbelu (born 10 May 2003) is a Nigerian professional footballer who plays as a midfielder for Nasarawa United.

Club career 
Ogbelu started his career at Fosla Academy. In December 2022, Ogbelu joined the Nigerian football club Nasarawa United.

International career 
In April 2022, Ogbelu was called up to the Nigerian under-20 side for the 2023 Africa U-20 Cup of Nations. In February 2023, Ogbelu was selected in the final Nigerian squad for the CAF U20 African Cup of Nations held in Egypt. In February 2023, Super Eagles coach Jose Peseiro, selected Ogbelu among four U-20 players to train with his team before their African Cup of Nations qualifying matches.

References 

2003 births
Living people
Nigerian footballers
Nigeria youth international footballers
Association football midfielders